Gavialiceps taeniola is an eel in the family Muraenesocidae (pike congers). It was described by Alfred William Alcock in 1889. It is a marine, deep water-dwelling eel which is known from the Indian Ocean, including the Arabian Sea, Oman, and the Bay of Bengal.

References

Muraenesocidae
Fish described in 1889